TID was a standardized British design for a tugboat drawn up and built during the Second World War. One hundred and eighty two (TID-1 to TID-12 and TID-14 to TID-183) were built for the Ministry of War Transport.

Manufacture
Richard Dunston Ltd., a shipbuilding company with yards at Thorne on the Stainforth and Keadby Canal and at Hessle on the Humber, had pioneered the use of welded construction, rather than the more conventional rivetting, since 1933, although they had never built an all-welded vessel. An order for 12 tugs in 1942 was the opportunity to try such a design. They designed the hulls so that they could be made up from eight separate sections, which were fabricated by manufacturers with spare welding capacity. Shipbuilders with spare capacity were in short supply at the time, but other non-shipbuilding industry was available. At the yard, the sections were fitted together by welders, many of whom were women, and the engines were installed. The first tug was ready for despatch in February 1943, and for more than a year, one left the yard every five days.

The first 90 tugs built were fitted with coal-fired boiler, while subsequent ones were oil-fired. Dunston's built a total of 159 TID tugs, of which 152 were built at Thorne and seven at Hessle. These were supplemented by 23 which were built at the yard of William Pickersgill & Co., of Sunderland. Several of the oil-fired tugs were shipped to the Far East as deck cargo on larger vessels.

Draught when laden was  - a displacement of 124 tons. Propulsion was a 220 ihp 2 cylinder reciprocating steam engine driving a single screw. Steam was from coal or later oil - the change being to allow use in the Far East. They were capable of around 8 knots.

Gallery

See also
CHANT (ship type) - a standardized coastal tanker

References

Bibliography

External links

pictures of preserved TID
List of TID at medway maritime trust
Steam Tug TID 172 History & Preservation

Ministry of War Transport ships
Tugboats of the United Kingdom